Egon Matijevic (27 April 1922 – 20 July 2016) was an American chemist. He earned his B.Sc. and Ph.D. in chemistry from the University of Zagreb. After specialization at the University of Cambridge he continued to work at the Clarkson University. He is the author of more than 550 scientific papers in colloidal and surface chemistry with numerous applications in medicine and industry. Matijevic was a member of American Chemical Society, American Association for Crystal Growth, World Academy of Ceramics, International Association of Colloid and Interface Scientists and honorary member of American Ceramic Society, German Colloid Society, Chemical Society of Japan and Materials Research Society of Japan.

See also
 Solvophoresis

References

External links

1922 births
2016 deaths
American chemists
Faculty of Science, University of Zagreb alumni
Yugoslav emigrants to the United States
Alumni of the University of Cambridge
Yugoslav expatriates in the United Kingdom